The Love Waltz is a 1930 German English language musical film directed by Carl Winston and starring Lilian Harvey, Georg Alexander and John Batten. It is the English-language version of Waltz of Love (1930) which also starred Harvey.

Following the introduction of sound films, a large number of multi-language versions (MLVs) were made  by UFA to allow its films to reach the lucrative British and American markets. The film was produced by Erich Pommer who took an interest in MLVs. The film was part of a transitional stage in the development of MLVs as they moved from direct translations into more varied products tailored to individual markets.

Cast
 Lilian Harvey as Princess Eva
 Georg Alexander as Grandduke Peter Ferdinand
 John Batten as Bobby Fould
 Gertrud de Lalsky as Grandduchess Melanie
 Karl Ludwig Diehl as Lord Chamberlain
 Hans Junkermann as Fould, Bobby's Father
 Lilian Mower as Duchess zu Lauenburg
 C. Hooper Trask as Dr. Popper
 Mildred Wayne as Dolly

References

Bibliography

External links

1930 films
1930 musical comedy films
German musical comedy films
1930s English-language films
German multilingual films
Operetta films
Films set in Europe
German black-and-white films
Films produced by Erich Pommer
1930 multilingual films
1930s German films